Ludwig Hoffmann or Hofmann may refer to:

 Ludwig Hoffmann (architect) (1852–1932), German architect
 Ludwig Hoffmann (Waffen-SS) (1908–1945), Hauptsturmführer (Captain) in the Waffen-SS
 Ludwig Hofmann (footballer) (1900–1935), German footballer
 Ludwig Hofmann (bass) (1895–1963), German opera singer
 Leopold Hofmann, also Ludwig Hoffman, Austrian composer of classical music